Cylindrophyllum comptonii is a species of succulent plant belonging to the genus Cylindrophyllum of the family Aizoaceae. It is endemic to South Africa.

Taxonomy
Cylindrophyllum comptonii is classified under the genus Cylindrophyllum. It belongs to the tribe Ruschiae, subfamily Ruschioideae of the family Aizoaceae. It was first described by the South African botanist Harriet Margaret Louisa Bolus in 1932.

Description
Cylindrophyllum comptonii are small perennial succulent plant that form dense cushions. The leaves are slightly flattened dorsoventrally with an indistinct central ridge and pointed tips.

Distribution and habitat
Cylindrophyllum comptonii is endemic to the western part of Cape Province in South Africa. They grow found on flat shaly soil.

References

Aizoaceae
Taxa named by Louisa Bolus